Batman vs. Robin is a 2015 American animated superhero film which is the 22nd film of the DC Universe Animated Original Movies and the fifth film in the DC Animated Movie Universe. The film is partially based on the "Batman: The Court of Owls" saga written by Scott Snyder and illustrated by Greg Capullo and Jonathan Glapion, combined with aspects of Batman & Robin: Born to Kill by Peter Tomasi and Patrick Gleason and Detective Comics: Faces of Death arcs by Tony S. Daniel, and serves as a sequel to 2014's Son of Batman. The film was shown during WonderCon on April 3, 2015, and was released on Blu-ray and DVD formats on April 14.

Stuart Allan, Jason O'Mara, David McCallum, and Sean Maher reprise their respective roles from Son of Batman.

Plot
In the past, a young Bruce Wayne learns of a secret organization called the Court of Owls from his father Thomas, that lurks in the shadows. After witnessing the death of his parents, Bruce suspects that the Court was behind the murder but finds no evidence, which leads him to believe the Court was in fact just a story. In the present day, Bruce’s son Damian goes out as Robin to rescue a group of missing children abducted by Anton Schott, who has been turning them into dolls. Afterward, a mysterious figure in an owl costume suddenly appears and kills Anton, leaving a feather behind. However, due to his past violent actions, Bruce blames Damian for his murder, prompting him to place security measures around Wayne Manor to prevent Damian from going out as Robin.

The following night, Bruce goes out as Batman to track down the feather, leading him to a museum where he is confronted by a group of owl costumed assassins. They eventually capture him and take him to the Court of Owls headquarters, where he meets their leader the "Grandmaster". The Grandmaster offers Bruce the chance to join them, but he kindly declines, with the Court returning him home safely. Meanwhile, Damian manages to escape Wayne Manor, and while out he meets the same assassin who killed Anton, introducing himself as Talon. Talon takes Damian under his wing, training him to become a Court assassin.

Bruce infiltrates a Court headquarters and is taken out by hallucination gas, but is rescued by Nightwing and Alfred Pennyworth. When Damian is revealed to be Bruce's son, the Grandmaster rejects him under the decision to emotionally cripple Bruce with Damian's death, prompting Talon to attack the Court killing several members in the process before killing the Grandmaster, who is revealed to be socialite Samantha Vanaver, Bruce’s girlfriend, while also insisting that she would have done the same to him. Now having control of the Court, Talon leads an attack on Wayne Manor, but Batman, Nightwing and Alfred fend them off.

Damian escapes the Court headquarters and defeats Talon, telling him he can never be a better father than Bruce. In his defeat, Talon commits suicide by forcing Damian to stab him through the neck with his own sai. This greatly traumatizes Damian, who rejects Bruce’s offer to return home on the grounds that he doesn’t know who he is. Ultimately, Damian decides to leave Bruce, who suggests he should go to a monastery in the Himalayas in order to find himself.

Cast
 Jason O'Mara – Bruce Wayne / Batman
 Stuart Allan – Damian Wayne / Robin
 Jeremy Sisto – Talon
 Sean Maher – Dick Grayson / Nightwing
 David McCallum – Alfred Pennyworth
 Troy Baker – Court of Owls Lieutenant
 Kevin Conroy – Thomas Wayne
 Grey DeLisle – Samantha Vanaver
 Robin Atkin Downes – Court of Owls Grandmaster
 "Weird Al" Yankovic – Anton Schott / The Dollmaker
 Trevor Devall – Jack
 Griffin Gluck – Young Bruce Wayne
 Peter Onorati – Draco
 Andrea Romano – Jill

Reception

IGN rated it 6.7/10 and Screen Rant 2.5/5. The film earned $4,238,572 in domestic home video sales.

Sequels
A sequel titled Batman: Bad Blood was released in 2016 which was followed by Batman: Hush'' in 2019.

Notes

References

External links

 

2015 animated films
2015 films
2015 direct-to-video films
2015 action films
2010s American animated films
2010s direct-to-video animated superhero films
2010s animated superhero films
Animated action films
Animated Batman films
Robin (character) films
DC Animated Movie Universe
Direct-to-video sequel films
Films about father–son relationships
Films about dysfunctional families
Films about secret societies
Films directed by Jay Oliva
Films scored by Frederik Wiedmann
American animated superhero films
Films set in 2015
2010s English-language films